Tetrastylidium is a genus of flowering plants belonging to the family Olacaceae.

Its native range is Southern America.

Species:

Tetrastylidium grandifolium 
Tetrastylidium peruvianum

References

Olacaceae
Santalales genera